The St. Petersburg Bekhterev Psychoneurological Research Institute is a postgraduate education center and the oldest Russian scientific institution aimed at performing studies in the fields of neurology, psychiatry, psychology, and contiguous disciplines. The institute was established by Vladimir Bekhterev in 1907 with official support from the Emperor Nicholas II and the Russian Prime Minister P.A. Stolypin. Having founded the institute, V.M. Bekhterev became its first director. At present it is headed by Nikolay Neznanov.
The official publication of the institute is The Bekhterev Review of Psychiatry and Medical Psychology (Russian: Обозрение психиатрии и медицинской психологии им. В.М.Бехтерева)

See also 

The Bekhterev Review of Psychiatry and Medical Psychology

References

External links
  

Medical research institutes in Russia
1907 establishments in the Russian Empire
Organizations established in 1907
Research institutes in Saint Petersburg
Psychiatric research institutes
Mental health organizations in Russia
Hospital buildings completed in 1907
Government buildings completed in 1907
Medical research institutes in the Soviet Union
Cultural heritage monuments of regional significance in Saint Petersburg